Helinho may refer to:

 Helinho (footballer, born 1995) , Portuguese footballer
 Helinho (footballer, born 2000), Brazilian footballer playing for São Paulo FC